The 26th NAACP Image Awards ceremony, presented by the National Association for the Advancement of Colored People (NAACP), honored the best in film, television, music of 1993 and took place on January 5, 1994 at the Pasadena Civic Auditorium. It was the 8th year that the event was taped and recorded on NBC.

List of awards and nominees

Entertainer of the Year
 Whitney Houston

Outstanding Motion Picture
 Malcolm X

Lead Actor in a Motion Picture
 Denzel Washington, Malcolm X

Lead Actress in a Motion Picture
 Angela Bassett, What's Love Got to Do With It

Supporting Actor in a Motion Picture
 Al Freeman Jr., Malcolm X

Supporting Actress in a Motion Picture
 Angela Bassett, Malcolm X

Youth Actor or Actress
 Jaleel White, Family Matters

Comedy Series
 Martin

Actor in a Comedy Series
 Martin Lawrence, Martin

Actress in a Comedy Series
 Jasmine Guy, A Different World

Drama Series
 I'll Fly Away

Actor in a Drama Series
 Blair Underwood, L.A. Law

Actress in a Drama Series
 Regina Taylor, "I'll Fly Away."

Television Movie or Miniseries
 Alex Haley's Queen

Actor in a Television Movie or Miniseries 
 Danny Glover, "Alex Haley's Queen."

Actress in a Television Movie or Miniseries
 Halle Berry, "Alex Haley's Queen."

Daytime Drama Series
 The Young and the Restless

Actor in a Daytime Drama Series
 Kristoff St. John, The Young and the Restless

Actress in a Daytime Drama Series
 Victoria Rowell, The Young and the Restless

Variety Series
 The Arsenio Hall Show

Performance in a Variety Series
 Arsenio Hall, "The Arsenio Hall Show."

Variety Special
 "Sinbad Live From New York: Afros & Bellbottoms."

Performance in a Variety Special
 Patti LaBelle, "The 1993 Essence Awards."

News, Talk or Information Series or Special 
 "The Oprah Winfrey Show."

Youth or Children's Series or Special
 "Teen Summit: Teens & AIDS."

Performance in a Youth or Children's Series or Special
 LeVar Burton, "Reading Rainbow."

New Artist
 Shai, "If I Ever Fall in Love."

Male Artist
 Luther Vandross, "Never Let Me Go."

Female Artist
 Whitney Houston, "The Bodyguard," soundtrack.

Duo or Group
 En Vogue, "Runaway Love."

Gospel Artist
 The Winans, "All Out."

Jazz Artist
 Kenny G, "Breathless."

Rap Artist
 Jazzy Jeff & the Fresh Prince, "Boom! Shake the Room."

World Music Artist
 B. B. King, "Blues Summit."

Soundtrack Album (Film or Television)
 "The Bodyguard," various artists, featuring Whitney Houston.

Album
 "The Bodyguard," soundtrack, various artists, featuring Whitney Houston.

Music Video
 "I'm Every Woman," Whitney Houston.

Choreography in Film or Television
 Debbie Allen, "The 65th Annual Academy Awards."

Literary Work, Fiction
 "Your Blues Ain't Like Mine," by Bebe Moore Campbell.

Literary Work, Nonfiction
 "By Any Means Necessary: The Trials and Tribulations of the Making of Malcolm X," by Spike Lee with Ralph Wiley.

Literary Work, Children's
 "Sojourner Truth: "Ain't I a Woman?," by Patricia C. McKissack and Frederick McKissack.

References

26
N
N
N